The 2002 TD Waterhouse Cup was a men's tennis tournament played on outdoor hard courts at the Hamlet Golf and Country Club in Jericho, New York in the United States and was part of the International Series of the 2002 ATP Tour. It was the 22nd edition of the tournament and ran from August 19 through August 25, 2002. Paradorn Srichaphan won the singles title.

Finals

Singles

 Paradorn Srichaphan defeated  Juan Ignacio Chela 5–7, 6–2, 6–2
 It was Srichaphan's 1st title of the year and the 1st of his career.

Doubles

 Mahesh Bhupathi /  Mike Bryan defeated  Petr Pála /  Pavel Vízner 6–3, 6–4
 It was Bhupathi's 4th title of the year and the 25th of his career. It was Bryan's 6th title of the year and the 10th of his career.

TD Waterhouse Cup
Connecticut Open (tennis)
2002 in sports in Connecticut
2002 in American tennis